Rhabdophis chiwen, the Chiwen keelback, is a keelback snake in the family Colubridae. It is endemic to Sichuan (China) and known from its type locality, Jiguan Mountain in Chongzhou, and from the neighboring Tianquan County.

Adult males measure  and adult females  in snout–vent length.

References

Rhabdophis
Snakes of China
Endemic fauna of Sichuan
Reptiles described in 2020